Sir Henry Goring, 2nd Baronet (1 May 1622 – 3 April 1702) was an English barrister and politician.

Goring was the son of Henry Goring and Mary, daughter of Sir Thomas Eversfield, High Sheriff of Sussex. He succeeded as second Baronet of Highden on 25 February 1658, according to a special remainder in the letters patent. Goring sat as Member of Parliament for Sussex from 1660 to 1661 and for Steyning in 1660 and again from 1661 to 1679.

Goring married Frances, daughter of Sir Edward Bishopp, 2nd Baronet, in 1642. She died in December 1694. Goring died on 3 April 1702, aged 79, and was succeeded in the baronetcy by his grandson, Charles.

References

1622 births
1702 deaths
Baronets in the Baronetage of England
English MPs 1660
English MPs 1661–1679
English MPs 1679
English MPs 1685–1687